Polymannuronate hydrolase (polymannuronic acid polymerase) is an enzyme with systematic name poly(mannuronide) mannuronohydrolase. This enzyme catalyses the following chemical reaction

 Endohydrolysis of the D-mannuronide linkages of polymannuronate

This enzyme does not act on alginic acid, which is a copolymer of polymannuronate.

References

External links 
 

EC 3.2.1